Jonathan Mullin (born 1978) is an Irish journalist, former footballer and coach. He is current editor of the Irish version of the Racing Post. He was previously Gaelic Games Correspondent for RTÉ Television News, the first person to hold this role. Mullin has worked for several local and national publications, including as one of the first journalists with both The Athlone Voice and the Irish Daily Mail. His specific interests are horse racing and Gaelic games.

Journalism
Mullin is originally from Frenchbrook, Kilmaine, County Mayo. He studied corporate law at NUI Galway. During his free time he worked with MidWest Radio and The Connaught Telegraph. A career change of mind prompted him to take the Higher Diploma in Applied Communications at NUIG around 2001. He then worked as a Sports Sub-editor with the Evening Echo before working for a year as a sports reporter with The Mayo News, sports editor of fledgling publication The Athlone Voice from September 2003 until 2006, then deputy sports editor with the fledgling Irish Daily Mail before applying for the RTÉ job. Mullin began working for the RTÉ News Sports Unit in October 2006.

He received the ESB National Media Award for Provincial/Regional Sport Print in 2004 for covering Westmeath's first Leinster Senior Football Championship.

In February 2010 he announced his departure from RTÉ to become the Irish Racing Posts editor. He took up the role in March 2010.

Coaching and playing career
Mullin played for the Mayo county football team, winning a minor medal in the 1996 Connacht Minor Football Championship. He was coach and joint-manager of the county's ladies football team between 1998 and 2001, guiding them to two All-Ireland Senior Ladies' Football Championship wins as well as to a National Football League title. Mullin has also played for Mayo in association football.

References

1978 births
Living people
Alumni of the University of Galway
Irish editors
Ladies' Gaelic football managers
Mayo Gaelic footballers 
RTÉ newsreaders and journalists